Harry Y. Gamble jr. (born in 1941) is an American professor emeritus within the Department of Religious Studies at the University of Virginia. He retired from full-time teaching in 2014.

Life

Education 
Gamble earned a Bachelor of Arts (BA) at Wake Forest University, a Master of Divinity (MDiv) at Duke University and a Master of Arts (MA) at Yale University. From 1970, Gamble holds a PhD from Yale University. His doctoral dissertation is titled: The textual history of the Letter to the Romans.

Teaching 
In 1970, Gamble joined the Religious Studies Department at the University of Virginia (Professor of New Testament and Early Christianity). From 1992 to 2006, Gamble chaired the department, and he retired from full-time teaching in 2014.

Contributions 
His research was on the topic of the development of the New Testament, particularly "the extent of Literacy in early Christian communities; the relation in the early church between Oral tradition and written materials; the physical form of early Christian books; how books were produced, transcribed, published, duplicated, and disseminated; how Christian libraries were formed; who read the books, in what circumstances, and to what purposes."

Published works

Thesis

Books

References

External links 

Living people
1941 births
American religion academics
University of Virginia faculty
Wake Forest University alumni
Yale University alumni
Duke University alumni